The Five Knights' case (1627) 3 How St Tr 1 (also Darnel's or Darnell's case) (K.B. 1627), is a case in English law, and now United Kingdom constitutional law, fought by five knights (among them Thomas Darnell) in 1627 against forced loans placed on them by King Charles I in a common law court.

Background
In 1626, Charles I had recalled Parliament to approve taxes for the Anglo-Spanish War (1625–1630). While supportive of the conflict, Parliament first demanded an investigation into the conduct of the army commander, the Duke of Buckingham, notorious for inefficiency and extravagance. Charles refused to allow this and instead adopted a policy of "forced loans"; those who refused to pay would be imprisoned without trial, and if they continued to resist, sent before the Privy Council.

The Chief Justice Sir Randolph Crewe ruled this policy was illegal and the judiciary complied only after he was dismissed. There were over 76 men who refused to pay the tax as they claimed that it was unauthorized by Parliament. Among them were Sir Thomas Darnell, Sir John Corbet, Sir Walter Erle, Sir John Heveningham and Sir Edmund Hampden, who submitted a joint petition for habeas corpus. Approved on 3 November 1627, the court ordered the five be brought before them in order to clarify what law they had broken; it became known as Darnell's Case, although Darnell himself withdrew.

Judgment
The case was heard by Sir Nicholas Hyde, the new Lord Chief Justice, with the prosecution led by Attorney General Sir Robert Heath. The problem before the court was the defendants had been arrested but the warrants did not specify why; this was unsurprising, since Coke had previously ruled the loans themselves were illegal.

Heath claimed the Royal Prerogative allowed Charles to take whatever action he considered necessary "in time of crisis" and thus he had no need to justify the detentions. The defence was led by John Selden, counsel for Edmund Hampden, a distinguished legal scholar who argued that 'without which we have nothing', or else jeopardize the ancient liberties of freeborn Englishmen: 'no man can be justly imprisoned by either of them [the king or the privy council], without a cause of the commitment expressed in the return' and doing otherwise jeopardised the "ancient liberties of freeborn Englishmen".

Since the judges were unable to determine what law had been broken, they avoided the issue by denying bail, on the grounds that as there were no charges, "the [prisoners] could not be freed, as the offence was probably too dangerous for public discussion". At the end, the judges refused to rule on the Five Knights' Case based on that decision. Even if the judgment was undetermined, it is obvious that Charles' action to break the law and abuse his authority.

Significance

Although the judges had refused to release the prisoners, Charles decided not to pursue charges; since his opponents included the previous Chief Justice, and other senior legal officers, the ruling meant the loans would almost certainly be deemed illegal. So many now refused payment, the reduction in projected income forced him to recall Parliament in 1628, while the controversy returned "a preponderance of MPs opposed to the King".

Selden claimed afterwards there was an effort made by Charles and Robert Heath to tamper with the rulings of the case, pointing to the fact that both Heath and Hyde were subsequently knighted. While historians have generally agreed with Selden's assertions, Mark Kishlansky has disputed them. The Petition of Right 1628 reversed the effect of the decision by preventing the power of arbitrary committal by the King. The Habeas Corpus Act 1640 restored the right to petition the courts for release against the wishes of the King and his Council.

References

Sources

External links
 

Court of King's Bench (England) cases
1627 in law
1627 in England
Royal prerogative
Charles I of England
United Kingdom constitutional case law